Sydney John Lipton (14 December 1905 – 19 July 1995) was a British dance band leader, popular from the 1930s to the 1960s when he led "one of the most polished of the British Dance Bands."

Life and career
Born in London, he learned the violin as a child before joining cinema orchestras providing the accompaniment to silent movies.  When living in Edinburgh in the early 1920s he began playing in the band led by Murray Hedges, before joining the Billy Cotton Band in 1925 and making his first recordings.  He also recorded with Ambrose's orchestra in the mid-1920s.   He left Cotton to form his own dance band in 1931, and the following year became the resident bandleader at the Grosvenor House Hotel in London.

His band started recording in 1932, first for Zonophone and then Decca, and made regular appearances on BBC radio after 1933. The recordings with his band were made from 1932 through 1941, and the band's radio broadcasts were made at Grosvenor House where the band was in residence. Among his musicians were instrumentalists Ted Heath, George Evans, Billy Munn, Harry Hayes, Bill McGuffie, Freddy Gardner, and Max Goldberg. His daughter Celia Lipton, who later made a career as an actress and singer, joined as vocalist in the 1940s. Other singers who performed with the ensemble included Anona Wynn, Primrose Hayes, Les Allen, and Chips Chippindall. The band's first hit song was "I’ll See You In My Dreams". Later successful tunes included "Just Dance And Leave The Music To Me" and "Sweet Harmony".

During World War II, Lipton was a member of the Royal Artillery and the Royal Signals. After serving in the forces, he returned to the Grosvenor House Hotel, and continued to lead the orchestra there until 1967.  He later formed his own entertainment agency, and served as musical director for various venues and cruise ships.

He died, aged 89, in Palm Beach, Florida, where he had retired to be near his daughter Celia.

References

1905 births
1995 deaths
English bandleaders
Musicians from London
British Army personnel of World War II
Royal Artillery personnel
Royal Corps of Signals soldiers
Military personnel from London